WVEA-TV (channel 50) is a television station licensed to Tampa, Florida, United States, broadcasting the Spanish-language Univision and UniMás networks to the Tampa Bay area. Owned and operated by TelevisaUnivision, WVEA-TV maintains studios in the Westlake Corporate Center office park (near SR 589) in Tampa, and its transmitter is located on an antenna farm in Riverview, Florida.

History

The station first signed on the air on May 3, 1991 as WBSV-TV (for Bradenton, Sarasota, and Venice, the three cities it primarily served) on channel 62; locally owned by DeSoto Broadcasting, it originally operated as an English-language independent station serving the Sarasota area, and competed with the area's ABC affiliate WWSB (channel 40) and the other stations in the Tampa Bay and nearby Fort Myers markets. As WBSV, the station ran a variety of syndicated and local programming, along with infomercials and home shopping programs; early on, the station also produced a local newscast. However, the station was unprofitable, eventually relying more on home shopping and infomercials to keep the station afloat.

In 2000, the station was acquired by Entravision Communications, with the intent of moving its transmitter from Venice to Riverview and move Univision programming to the station from Entravision's existing low-power affiliate, WVEA-LP (channel 61). WBSV's history ended in early 2001, when the station ceased broadcasting for a few weeks to perform the move and establish WVEA's new studio facilities. In March 2001, the station returned to the air with its current programming and call letters.

On December 4, 2017, as part of a channel swap made by Entravision Communications, WVEA and its sister station, WFTT swapped channel numbers with WVEA moving from digital channel 25 and virtual channel 62 to digital channel 47 and virtual channel 50.

On October 13, 2021, Univision announced it would take over operation of WVEA-TV, as well as Orlando Univision affiliate WVEN-TV, effective January 1, 2022, coinciding with the end of licensing agreements on December 31, 2021.

In addition, even though WVEA-TV's public file shows them located at their former studios on Hillsborough Avenue in Tampa (in a former Barnett Bank building west of Armenia Avenue), WVEA-TV moved their facilities to the Westlake Corporate Center office park almost 4 miles north of the Tampa International Airport. This was made possible due to the FCC's Main Studio Rule being repealed in 2019. As WVEA-TV's newscast operates from their Orlando sister station WVEN-TV, their new facility houses their advertising sales office and their news vehicles serving the Tampa Bay area.

Intellectual property
The WVEA call letters and programming originated on low-power station W50AC (channel 50). That station operated as Tampa Bay's first Spanish-language television station, operating as an affiliate of the Spanish International Network (the forerunner of Univision), when it signed on the air in 1982. In 1988, to make way for new Home Shopping Network flagship station WBHS (channel 50, now WFTT-DT channel 62), the station relocated to UHF channel 61 and changed its callsign to W61BL; in 1994, the station changed its call letters to WVEA-LP. After Entravision bought channel 62, in March 2001, the entire WVEA intellectual unit (studios, Univision affiliation and programming) moved from the low-power station on channel 61 to the full-power station on channel 62. WVEA-LP itself remained in operation on channel 46, carrying programming from HSN2, until the station's license was cancelled by the FCC on April 22, 2015. In 2017, WVEA-TV's PSIP was reassigned as channel 50, effectively returning Univision programming to a channel it vacated 29 years earlier.

News operation
WVEA-TV presently broadcasts five hours of locally produced newscasts each week (with one hour each weekday); the station does not broadcast any news programming on Saturdays or Sundays. The station's news department shares resources with Orlando sister station WVEN-TV. WVEA simulcast WVEN's news programming until 2013, when WVEA began producing its own newscasts under the title Noticias Tampa Bay. On November 2, 2015, production of WVEA's newscasts was transferred back to WVEN; under this arrangement, WVEA's early evening newscast is produced live to tape an hour before WVEN's live newscast. In 2011 it produced 5 minute news blocks on Facebook which ended when the news department relaunched. WVEN continues to produce sports and weather segments inserted into WVEA's newscasts.

Technical information

Subchannels
The station's digital signal is multiplexed:

Until 2013, WVEA-TV carried the Spanish-language music video network ZUUS Latino on its third digital subchannel.

Analog-to-digital conversion
WVEA-TV shut down its analog signal, over UHF channel 62, on June 12, 2009, as part of the federally mandated transition from analog to digital television. The station's digital signal remained on its pre-transition UHF channel 25, using PSIP to display WVEA-TV's virtual channel as 62 on digital television receivers, which was among the high band UHF channels (52-69) that were removed from broadcasting use as a result of the transition.

References

External links
Official website

VEA-TV
Television channels and stations established in 1991
VEA-TV
1991 establishments in Florida
Univision network affiliates
Bounce TV affiliates
GetTV affiliates
Ion Mystery affiliates
UniMás network affiliates